Narrows is an American mathcore band based in Seattle, but with members "spread out across both the United States and two continents." The band has been described as a supergroup, as its lineup includes Dave Verellen of Botch and members of bands including Unbroken, These Arms Are Snakes and Bullet Union. Narrows is a part-time band. All members have full-time jobs and are starting their own families.

Members
 Jodie Cox – guitar (also of Tropics, Bullet Union)
 Ryan Frederiksen – guitar (also of These Arms Are Snakes, Dust Moth, Nineironspitfire)
 Sam Stothers – drums (also of Makeout Boys)
 Dave Verellen – vocals (also of Botch, Roy)
 Rob Moran – bass guitar (also of Unbroken, Some Girls)

Discography

Studio albums
 New Distances (Deathwish, 2009)
 Painted (Deathwish, 2012)

EPs
 Narrows (Deathwish, 2008)
 Heiress / Narrows (split with Heiress) (Deathwish, 2010)
 Narrows / Retox (split with Retox) (Three.One.G, 2014)

Music videos
 "Chambered" (2009)
 "Gypsy Kids" (2009)
 "TB Positive" (2012)

References

External links 
 
 

Musical groups established in 2008
American mathcore musical groups
Hardcore punk groups from Washington (state)
Heavy metal musical groups from Washington (state)
Musical groups from Seattle
American sludge metal musical groups
Deathwish Inc. artists
2008 establishments in Washington (state)
Metalcore musical groups from Washington (state)